Tommaso Ghirardello (born 19 October 2005) is an Italian professional footballer, who plays as a winger for  club Padova.

Club career 

Born in Rovigo and raised in Lendinara, Ghirardello started playing football at the local grassroots club GS Duomo, before joining Padova in 2015. Here, he spent most of his youth career, except for two loan spells, respectively, at S.P.A.L. and Juventus.

Having come back to Padova in the summer of 2022, Ghirardello was subsequently promoted to the first team by the club's new manager, . He subsequently made his professional debut on 1 August 2022, at 16 years and 10 months, coming in as a substitute for Simone Russini at the 67th minute of a 3-0 defeat against Bari, a match that was part of the preliminary round of the Coppa Italia. On 3 September, he made his Serie C debut, replacing Fabio Ceravolo in the second half of the league match against Pro Vercelli, which ended in a 1-0 loss.

Style of play 

Ghirardello mainly acts as a winger, and has been regarded mainly for his pace, his physical strength and his technical abilities with both feet, which allow him to find numerous chances for goals or assists.

Career statistics

References

External links 

 
 

2005 births
Living people
Sportspeople from Veneto
Italian footballers
Calcio Padova players
Association football wingers